Elzunia is a Neotropical genus of butterflies of the family Nymphalidae, subfamily Danainae, and tribe Ithomiini.

List of species
 Elzunia humboldt (Latreille, 1809)
 Elzunia pavonii (Butler, 1873)

References

Elzunia Bryk, 1937 at BioLib.cz
Elzunia Bryk, 1937 at Markku Savela's Lepidoptera and Some Other Life Forms

Ithomiini
Nymphalidae of South America
Nymphalidae genera
Taxa named by Felix Bryk